Dejan Srzić (born 28 June 1955), also known by his nickname Susla, is a Serbian professional basketball coach and former player.

Coaching career 
During his coaching career, Srzić was a head coach for Varda Višegrad, Larisa, Panionios, Partizan, Jugotes TNN, Kumanovo, Mladost Zemun, Kolubara, Panathinaikos Limassol, Elektra, Radnički Belgrade, Mavrovo, Osijek 2016, Vrijednosnice Osijek Darda. He was an assistant coach to Giannis Ioannidis in Aris.

In March 2019, Srzić was hired as the head coach of Jedinstvo Bijelo Polje for the 2018–19 Montenegrin Super League season.

National teams coaching career 
During the 1980s, Srzić was an assistant coach to the Yugoslavia Junior team. With the under-18 national team at the European Championships for Juniors, he won two gold medals (1986 and 1988), a silver medal (1982) and a bronze medal (1984). With the national under-19 team Srzić won the gold medal at the 1987 FIBA Under-19 World Championship in Bormio, Italy.

Career achievements 
As assistant coach
 Greek League champion: 3 (with Aris: 1985–86, 1986–87, 1987–88)
 Greek Cup winner: 2 (with Aris: 1986–87, 1987–88)

References

External links 
 Dejan Srzic at eurobasket.com

1955 births
Living people
BKK Radnički coaches
KK Kolubara coaches
KK Mladost Zemun coaches
KK Partizan coaches
KK Crvena zvezda assistant coaches
OKK Beograd players
KK Crvena zvezda youth players
KK Ušće coaches
KK Vrijednosnice Osijek coaches
Panionios B.C. coaches
Serbian expatriate basketball people in Bosnia and Herzegovina
Serbian expatriate basketball people in Croatia 
Serbian expatriate basketball people in Cyprus
Serbian expatriate basketball people in Greece
Serbian expatriate basketball people in Montenegro
Serbian expatriate basketball people in North Macedonia
Serbian expatriate basketball people in Slovenia
Serbian men's basketball players
Serbian men's basketball coaches
University of Belgrade Faculty of Sport and Physical Education alumni
Yugoslav basketball coaches
Yugoslav men's basketball players
Place of birth missing (living people)